Brunnenburg is a 13th-century castle in the province of South Tyrol, in northern Italy.

History 
Schloss Brunnenburg is situated above the city of Merano, on the outskirts of the municipality of Tirol. Originally built circa 1250, the castle was completely restored and updated in the mid-20th century by Boris de Rachewiltz, an Egyptologist, and his wife Mary, daughter of the poet Ezra Pound and  violinist Olga Rudge, who have made it their home. Surrounding the castle is the family's vineyard.

Pound stayed with his daughter and her family at the castle in 1958 after he returned from the United States. It was there that he wrote the last 6 of his 116 "cantos" of The Cantos.

The Ezra Pound Centre for Literature
"The Ezra Pound Centre for Literature" was established at the castle by his daughter, where students come from all over the world to study the poet's works. A large guesthouse on the castle grounds is used as temporary housing for students, usually for a semester at a time.

External links 

 Brunnenburg Castle
 The Ezra Pound Center for Literature
 Great Adventures at Brunnenburg Castle

Castles in South Tyrol
Museums in South Tyrol
Ezra Pound
13th-century establishments in Italy
Establishments in the Princely County of Tyrol